Anthony Rother (born 29 April 1972) is an electronic music composer, producer and label owner living in Frankfurt, Germany.

Music style
Rother is considered a pioneer of a form of electronic music that developed in Europe in the 1990s, which combined elements of Italo dance music, synthpop, and electro fused with four on the floor rhythm. Rother's electro sound ("Sex With the Machines", "Simulationszeitalter", "Hacker") is characterized by repetitive machine-like beats, robotic, vocoder-driven vocals, melancholy, futuristic mood and lyrics that often deal with the consequences of technological progress, the relationship between humans and machines, and the role of computers in society.

In addition to electro, Rother also composes dark ambient music ("Elixir of Life", "Art Is a Technology"). He has also produced music for Sven Väth and DJ Hell.

Discography
$ex with the Machines (1997)
Simulationszeitalter (2000)
Art Is A Division of Pain (2001) (as Psi Performer)
Little Computer People (2001) (as Little Computer People)
Hacker (2002)
Live Is Life Is Love (2003)
Elixir of Life (2003) (ambient)
Magic Diner (2003) (ambient)
Popkiller (2004)
Art Is A Technology (2005) (ambient)
Super Space Model (2006)
My Name Is Beuys Von Telekraft (2008)
Popkiller II (2010)
62 Minutes On Mars (2011)
The Machine Room (2011) (ambient)
Verbalizer (2011)
Netzwerk Der Zukunft (2014)
Verbalizer (2014)
Koridium (2015)
Terazoid / Octagon (2015)

Compilations
Various – In Electro We Trust (2004)
Anthony Rother – This Is Electro (Works 1997 - 2005) (2005)
Various – We Are Punks (2007)
Various – We Are Punks 2 (2007)
Various – We Are Punks 3 (2008)
Various – Fuse Presents Anthony Rother (2009)
Anthony Rother - Past Represents The Future (2012)
Various – Robotics EP (2021)

Remixes
 ALBUM ADJ - MIX 2 - ADJ - MIX - Free download at Bandcamp
 Miss Kittin & The Hacker - "1982" (1998)

References

External links
 Datapunk, Rother's new record label
 PSI49NET, Rother's first record label
 
 Myspace.com: Anthony Rother
 Official Instagram Page: Anthony Rother
 Anthony Rother @ Last.fm

1972 births
Living people
German record producers
Electro musicians